Bernie Hayden (4 January 1915 – 12 July 1971) was an Australian rules footballer who played for the St Kilda Football Club in the Victorian Football League (VFL).

Notes

External links 

1915 births
1971 deaths
Australian rules footballers from Victoria (Australia)
St Kilda Football Club players
People educated at Xavier College